Sheraldo Becker (born 9 February 1995) is a professional footballer who plays as a winger for Bundesliga club Union Berlin. He has played in both the Netherlands and Germany. Born in the Netherlands, he represents the Suriname national team.

Club career

Ajax
Becker was discovered during a talent day and was recruited to the Ajax Youth Academy in 2004. On 6 June 2011, it was announced that Becker had signed his first professional contract with the club until 30 June 2014.

Becker began the 2013–14 season playing for the A1 under-19 squad where he made five appearances in the group stage of the UEFA Youth League. On 14 October 2013, he made his professional debut for the reserves team Jong Ajax in a 3–0 home defeat to Fortuna Sittard in the Eerste Divisie. On 28 February 2014, Becker scored his first professional goal against Den Bosch. On 8 May 2014, he was called up to the first team by manager Frank de Boer for two friendly matches against Persija Jakarta and Persib Bandung in Indonesia., playing in the 3–0 win over Persija on 12 May 2014.

PEC Zwolle (loan)
On 4 January 2015, it was announced that Becker was sent on loan to PEC Zwolle until the end of the season.

ADO Den Haag
On 17 August 2016, it was confirmed that Becker would play for ADO Den Haag from the 2016–17 season. He signed a three-year-deal with the club from The Hague. He stayed there until the 2018–19 season.

Union Berlin
In June 2019, German club 1. FC Union Berlin, newly promoted to the Bundesliga, announced the signing of Becker. 

Becker was awarded the Bundesliga Player of the Month in August 2022 after scoring 4 goals and 2 assists in 4 games, making him the first Union player to achieve this.

International career

Netherlands
Becker was born in the Netherlands to Surinamese parents. Becker represented the Netherlands, his country of birth at various youth levels, making his debut for the Netherlands under-16 team in a 1–0 loss to Portugal at the 12th Tournoi Val de Marne '10 in France on 28 October 2010. He scored his first goal for the under-16 side on 6 February 2011 at the International Youth Tournament in Portugal, in the 4–1 win against Israel. On 16 September 2011, Becker made his debut for the U-17 team in the 1–0 win against Italy at the Vier Nationen Turnier in Germany. He scored his first under-17 goal against England at the XXXV Torneio Int. do Algarve '12 in Portugal. He scored once for the under-18 team in a friendly match against the United States on 11 September 2012. On 26 February 2014, Becker was called up by Wim van Zwam to the under-19 team for the friendly match against Spain on 5 March 2014. He made his under-19 debut in a 2–1 win, starting on the wing before being substituted off for Wessel Dammers in the 69th minute of the match.

Suriname
On 23 November 2020 it was announced by the SVB that Becker was fully eligible to represent the Suriname national team internationally. Although Suriname does not allow dual citizenship, the country have made an exception to issue special passports for athletes in the diaspora who want to represent Suriname as of 2019. He debuted with the Suriname national team in a 6–0 2022 FIFA World Cup qualification win over Bermuda on 4 June 2021, scoring a brace in his first start for the team. A couple of weeks later on 25 June Becker was named to the Surinamese squad for the 2021 CONCACAF Gold Cup.

Career statistics

Club

International

Suriname score listed first, score column indicates score after each Becker goal

Honours
Individual
Bundesliga Player of the Month: August 2022

References

External links
 Netherlands stats at OnsOranje
 

1995 births
Living people
Footballers from Amsterdam
Surinamese footballers
Suriname international footballers
Dutch footballers
Netherlands youth international footballers
Association football wingers
Jong Ajax players
PEC Zwolle players
ADO Den Haag players
1. FC Union Berlin players
Eredivisie players
Eerste Divisie players
Bundesliga players
Expatriate footballers in Germany
Dutch expatriate sportspeople in Germany
Surinamese expatriate sportspeople in Germany
2021 CONCACAF Gold Cup players
Surinamese expatriate footballers
Dutch sportspeople of Surinamese descent
Dutch expatriate footballers